The 2010 Mitrovica attacks in North Mitrovica refer to a number of incidents that occurred on July 2, September 11 and September 28, 2010.

July 2
An explosive device was thrown into a group of Kosovo Serbs who were protesting against the Government's intention to open a governmental office in the area, where Kosovo Serbs live. 1 person was killed and 11 were injured.
Both Kosovan and Serbian authorities condemned the attack. At the moment there are no suspects. July 3 was declared a day of mourning by North Kosovan municipality Leaders in North Mitrovica, Zvečan, Leposavić and Zubin Potok.

Serbian Prime Minister Mirko Cvetković stated that violence in Mitrovica represents a terrorist attack.

September 11
Following the quarterfinals of the World Basketball Championship where Turkey beat Serbia, a fighting occurred between Kosovo Albanians and Kosovo Serbs. One Serb youth was shot and wounded in the arm by an EULEX police officer, three other lightly, a total of 7 were injured including an EULEX soldier.

September 28
An explosion device of 200 grams of TNT destroyed a cell site of a mobile carrier that services Albanians. A 3-year old Serb girl was injured, not life-threatening. The roof space was rented out by a local Serb working for the Kosovo police. EULEX and KFOR arrived at the scene and blocked North Mitrovica.

See also 
 North Kosovo

Notes and references
Notes:

References:

Attacks in Europe in 2010
Terrorist incidents in Europe in 2010
Mitrovica, Kosovo
North Kosovo
2010 crimes in Kosovo
2010s murders in Kosovo
2010 murders in Europe
North Kosovo crisis